Chafie Ali Fields (born February 4, 1977 in Philadelphia, Pennsylvania) is a sports and talent agent. He is a former professional American football wide receiver in the National Football League. He played college football at Penn State University.

Fields partnered with Joel Segal, the longtime head of Worldwide Entertainment & Sports in 2005. Their firm, Fields Consulting, based in Miami, Florida, represents various athletes and entertainers, most notably Arizona Cardinals 2007 first-round draft pick Levi Brown, Detroit Lions wide receiver Bryant Johnson, Buffalo Bills 2009 first-round pick Aaron Maybin, and Oakland Raiders 2015 first-round selection wide receiver Amari Cooper. 

Although Fields resides in Miami, he is a partner in a Philadelphia restaurant, Halal Bilah.

Football career
Fields was a dual-threat wide receiver for Penn State from 1996 to 1999, where he ranks 10th on the all-time receiving list, with 88 catches for 1,437 yards. He is perhaps best known for his 84-yard double reverse in Penn State's 38-15 win over Texas in the 1997 Fiesta Bowl. Fields went undrafted in the 2000 NFL Draft due to concerns about a nagging ankle injury. He spent a season each with the San Francisco 49ers, the Denver Broncos, and the New York Jets who released him prior to the 2002 regular season.  He never played in a regular season or postseason NFL game.

Fields earned his Bachelor of Science in Human Development and Family Studies from Penn State in 1999. He attended Mastbaum Area Vocational/Technical School, in Philadelphia where he was named All-America by SuperPrep magazine, Blue Chip Illustrated and USA Today.

References

1977 births
Living people
American football wide receivers
Players of American football from Philadelphia
Denver Broncos players
New York Jets players
Penn State Nittany Lions football players
Sportspeople from Philadelphia
San Francisco 49ers players
American sports agents
American talent agents